Busek Co. Inc. is an American spacecraft propulsion company that builds thrusters, electronics, and various systems for spacecraft.

History
Busek was founded in 1985 by Vlad Hruby in Natick, Massachusetts. Busek started as a laboratory outside of Boston, Massachusetts.

Flight missions

TacSat-2 

The first US Hall thruster flown in space, Busek's BHT-200, was launched aboard the Air Force Research Laboratory's (AFRL) TacSat-2 satellite. The Busek thruster was part of the Microsatellite Propulsion Integration (MPI) Experiment and was integrated on TacSat-2 under the direction of the DoD Space Test Program. TacSat-2 launched on December 16, 2006, from the NASA Wallops Flight Facility.

LISA Pathfinder 
The first electrospray thruster that made it to space was manufactured by Busek and launched aboard the European Space Agency's LISA Pathfinder satellite on December 3, 2015. The micro-newton colloid-style electric thruster was developed under contract with NASA's Jet Propulsion Laboratory (NASA ST-7 Program), and part of NASA's Disturbance Reduction System (DRS) which serves a critical role in the LISA Pathfinder science mission.

AEHF 
Aerojet, under license with Busek, manufactured the 4 kW Hall thruster (the BPT-4000) which was flown aboard the USAF AEHF communications spacecraft. This thruster is credited with raising an incapable satellite back to a geosynchronous orbit after the failure of the spacecraft's main apogee engine.

Contracts

NASA 
Busek will be providing Hall thrusters for NASA's Artemis Program. As part of the Power and Propulsion Element, Busek's 6 kW Hall thrusters will work in combination with NASA's Advanced Electric Propulsion System to provide orbit raising and station keeping capabilities for the Lunar Gateway. The Lunar Gateway's polar near-rectilinear halo orbit (NRHO) will require periodic orbit adjustment, and electric propulsion will use solar energy for this task.

Research and development

Propulsion 

Busek has demonstrated experimental xenon Hall thrusters at power levels up to and exceeding 20kW. Busek has also developed Hall thrusters that operate on iodine, bismuth, carbon dioxide, magnesium, zinc, and other substances. In 2008, a xenon fueled Busek Hall thruster appeared in National Geographic. An iodine fueled 200 W Busek Hall thruster will fly on NASA's upcoming iSat (Iodine Satellite) mission. Busek is also preparing a 600 Watt iodine Hall thruster system for future Discovery Class missions.

Other publicized Busek technologies include RF ion engines and a resistojet rocket. Another focus is CubeSat propulsion, proposed for the 2018 Lunar IceCube mission.
 
, Busek was also working on a DARPA-funded program called DARPA Phoenix, which aims to recycle some parts of on-orbit spacecraft.

In September 2013, NASA awarded an 18‑month Phase I contract to Busek to develop an experimental concept called High Aspect Ratio Porous Surface (HARPS) microthruster system for use in tiny CubeSat spacecraft.

Orbital Debris Remover (ORDER) 

In order to deal with space debris, Busek proposed in 2014 a remotely controlled vehicle to rendezvous with this debris, capture it, and attach a smaller deorbit satellite to the debris. The remotely controlled vehicle would then drag the debris/smallsat-combination, using a tether, to the desired location. The larger sat would then tow the debris/smallsat combination to either deorbit or move it to a higher graveyard orbit by means of electric propulsion. The larger satellite is named the Orbital Debris Remover, or ORDER which will carry over 40 SUL (Satellite on an Umbilical Line) deorbit sats and sufficient propellant for the large number of orbital maneuvers required to effect a 40-satellite debris removal mission over many years. Busek is projecting the cost for such a space tug to be .

See also

AEHF
FalconSAT-3
FalconSAT-5 (USA-221)
LISA Pathfinder
Lunar IceCube
TacSat-2

References

1985 establishments in Massachusetts
Spacecraft propulsion